The 2003 Indian Federation Cup, also known as 2003 Tata Federation Cup due to sponsorship reasons, was the 25th season of the Indian Federation Cup. It was held between 26 July and 9 August 2003. Defending champions Mohun Bagan were eliminated by Mohammedan Sporting in the semi-final, who faced Mahindra United in the final. Mahindra United went on to win their maiden title with Shanmugam Venkatesh scoring the winner for them in the 78th minute. Raphaël Patron Akakpo of Mahindra United finished the tournament as the top-scorer with three goals.

Overview 
The All India Football Federation announced on 11 May 2003 that the tournament would commence on 25 July 2003 and completed on 8 August. The date of commencement was revised to 26 July in an announcement made on 10 July. The tournament made a return after a year's break. The Vivekananda Yuba Bharati Krirangan in Kolkata was announced as the venue of the matches and that 16 teams would compete. The fixtures were announced on the same day. While all matches were played at the Vivekananda Yuba Bharati Krirangan in Kolkata, the third quarter-final between Mahindra United and Air India was played at the Sailen Manna Stadium (then called Howrah Municipal Stadium) in order "to rest and repair the pitch" (former stadium).

Two new features were added for the tournament. Doping tests were conducted according to guidelines laid down by FIFA in that "random sampling of a player of each team selected by the draw of lots" was conducted. Secondly, players and match officials were brought under an personal accident policy of 100,000, while the spectators, including the media, were covered under a similar policy of 50,000.

Teams 
All teams that competed in the 2002–03 season of the National Football League were included in the tournament alongside the top four teams from the National Football League Second Division, the hitherto second tier of the Indian football league system.

Results
In case of a tie at regular time, extra time with golden goal was used. In case scores remain tied even after extra time, penalty shoot-out was used.

Round of 16

Quarter-finals

Semi-finals

Final 
Mohammedan Sporting qualified for the final for the first time in 13 years and 11 editions of the tournament while Mahindra United, who progressed to the final in 1991 and 1993, had never won the title.

References

External links
 
 25th "TATA" Federation Cup 2003 at RSSSF
 

Indian Federation Cup seasons
2002–03 domestic association football cups
2002–03 in Indian football